The Dearing Report, formally known as the reports of the National Committee of Inquiry into Higher Education, is a series of major reports into the future of Higher Education in the United Kingdom, published in 1997. The report was commissioned by the UK government and was the largest review of higher education in the UK since the Robbins Committee in the early 1960s. The principal author was Sir Ronald Dearing, the Chancellor of the University of Nottingham. It made 93 recommendations concerning the funding, expansion, and maintenance of academic standards.

The most significant change in funding recommended by the report is a shift from undergraduate tuition being funded entirely by grants from the government to a mixed system in which tuition fees, supported by low interest government loans, are raised.

The report recommended expansion of sub-degree courses, and degree level courses at university, proposing that there was sufficient demand from employers for applicants with higher qualifications for natural growth of higher education.

To the maintenance of standards the report recommended that the teaching staff receive some amount of training in teaching during their probationary period. It further proposes a system in which credit earned at one institution could be transferred to another.

The title "The Dearing Report" is also often given to the 2001 report "The Way Ahead: Church of England schools in the new millennium" which was chaired by Lord Dearing.

Committee members
1997 report
Sir John Arbuthnott
Brenda Dean, Baroness Dean of Thornton-le-Fylde
Sir Ronald Dearing (Chairman)
Sir Geoffrey Holland
Sir Ronald Oxburgh
David E. Potter
Sir George Quigley
Sir William Stubbs
Sir Richard Sykes
Sir David Watson
Sir David Weatherall

2001 report
Lord Dearing
The Rev John Hall

See also
Browne Review

References

External links
The Dearing Report
BBC article about Dearing
Dearing Report The Way Ahead

Higher education in the United Kingdom
Reports of the United Kingdom government
1997 in the United Kingdom